The 2011–12 Seattle Redhawks men's basketball team represented the Seattle University in the 2011–12 college basketball season. This was head coach Cameron Dollar's 3rd season at Seattle U. The Redhawks played their home games at KeyArena as Independent members of Division I. They finished 12–15 overall.

It was announced that this will be their last season as Independent Division I and will be moving on to Western Athletic Conference starting in the 2012–13 season.

2011–12 Team

Roster
Source

Schedule

|-
!colspan=9| Exhibition

|-
!colspan=9| Regular Season

References

Seattle Redhawks men's basketball seasons
Seattle
Seattle Seahawks Washington (state)
Seattle Redhawks men's basketball
Seattle Redhawks
Seattle Redhawks